Yannik Engelhardt (born 7 February 2001) is a German footballer who plays as a midfielder for German club SC Freiburg II, on loan from Werder Bremen II.

International career
Engelhardt has represented Germany at youth international level.

Career statistics

Club

Notes

References

2001 births
Living people
German footballers
Germany youth international footballers
Association football midfielders
Regionalliga players
3. Liga players
SV Werder Bremen players
SV Werder Bremen II players
SC Freiburg II players
People from Göttingen (district)
Footballers from Lower Saxony